Klinga mina klockor (Ring my Bells) is an album by Benny Andersson released in 1987. This album of Swedish folk music was a hit in Scandinavia.

Track listing
Inledningsvisa (Benny Andersson) - 2.00
Lottis Schottis (Benny Andersson & Björn Ulvaeus) - 1.55
Födelsedagsvals till Mona (Benny Andersson & Björn Ulvaeus) - 2.20
Om Min Syster (Benny Andersson) - 2.57
Efter Regnet (Benny Andersson, Text: Mats Nörklit) - 3.00
Ludvigs Leksakspolka (Benny Andersson) - 1.48
Gladan (Benny Andersson) - 1.38
Långsammazurkan (Benny Andersson) - 2.09
Tittis Sång (Benny Andersson) - 2.59
Trolskan (Benny Andersson & Björn Ulvaeus) - 2.03
Klinga mina klockor (Ring my Bells) (Benny Andersson, Text: Björn Ulvaeus) - 11.30

Miscellanea
Anni-Frid Lyngstad the ex-member of ABBA and Benny Andersson's ex-wife participated in the choir in the song Klinga mina klockor.

See also
Benny Andersson
Orsa Spelmän
Swedish Radio Symphony Orchestra
ABBA

References

1987 albums